The following is a list of confirmed video games with gay, lesbian, bisexual, or transgender characters, including any others falling under the LGBT umbrella term, in the 2010s. The numbers in this list are possibly higher due to fact that some characters remained unconfirmed, unsourced or controversial.

2010s

2010

2011

2012

2013

2014

2015

2016

2017

2018

2019

Video game series

A–D

F–J

K–N

R–Z

References

Bibliography
 

 
 
Video games
LGBT
LGBT characters in video games